Venkat International Public School was established in 1995 and affiliated to the Central Board of Secondary Education, New Delhi. The present strength of the school is around 5000. It follows a curriculum based on CBSE pattern supplemented with co-curricular and extra-curricular programs. The school is managed by a group led by T.Balakrishna, serving as the Chairman & CEO of the institution.

it is group of institutions which consists of Venkat International Public School, St. Ann's High School, Venus International School.

Curriculum 
The curriculum has three programmes:
Montessori Classes to UK
Standard 1 to Standard 10
Standard 11 and Standard 12

Events
 World Record
Go Green Day
Yoga Day

References

External links

International schools in Bangalore
Educational institutions established in 1995
1995 establishments in Karnataka